Kim Soo-jin (Korean: 김수진) is a South Korean actress. She made her big screen debut in 2001, when she appeared in Wanee & Junah. She appeared in a number of hit dramas including School 2017 (2017), Misty (2018), and Watcher (2019).

Filmography

Film

Television series

Web series

Theater

Awards and nominations

Notes

References

External links
 
 
 Kim Soo-jin at PlayDB

Living people
South Korean television actresses
South Korean film actresses
South Korean stage actresses
21st-century South Korean actresses
Hanyang University alumni
1974 births